Issa Gouo (born 9 September 1989) is a Burkina Faso professional footballer, who plays as a defender for Guinean side AS Kaloum Star and the Burkina Faso national football team.

International career
In January 2014, coach Brama Traoré, invited him to be a part of the Burkina Faso squad for the 2014 African Nations Championship. The team was eliminated in the group stages after losing to  Uganda and Zimbabwe and then drawing with Morocco.

References

1989 births
Living people
Burkinabé footballers
Burkina Faso international footballers
2014 African Nations Championship players
Burkina Faso A' international footballers
ASFA Yennenga players
Santos FC Ouagadougou footballers
Burkinabé expatriate footballers
Expatriate footballers in Guinea
Place of birth missing (living people)
2015 Africa Cup of Nations players
Association football defenders
21st-century Burkinabé people
Burkinabé expatriate sportspeople in Guinea
AS Kaloum Star players